Glencoe High School is a public secondary school in Hillsboro, Oregon that is part of the Hillsboro School District. It was founded in 1980 to relieve overcrowding at Hillsboro High School caused by the city's rapid expansion. Glencoe High is the second oldest of the four high schools in the city. Glencoe is classified as a 6A school for activities and sports. It takes its name from the former community of Glencoe. In 2003, the school, along with all schools in the district, made national news when 17 days of classes were cut from the school year due to budget cuts to education in Oregon. IN 2016, the graduation rate was 86%.

Academics
In 2008, 85% of the school's seniors received a high school diploma. Of 384 students, 328 graduated, 34 dropped out, five received a modified diploma, and 17 were still in high school the following year.

The school received a silver ranking in U.S. News & World Reports 2010 "America's Best High Schools" survey. For the second year in a row, Glencoe was recognized by the State of Oregon on the Oregon Report Card as "Exceptional"; one of six large high schools in the state to receive that recognition. Glencoe is a certified Project Lead The Way school.

The school offers eleven Advanced Placement classes and three second languages, and has a full metal/welding and woods curriculum. Glencoe's engineering courses are part of the nationally renowned Project Lead The Way (PLTW) and are housed in a lab funded by grants from Intel. The Visual and Performing Arts program is recognized for its marching band, choral work, drama productions, sculpture and photography.

Athletics
Glencoe has won state championships in track and field, men's and women's basketball, and football (twice, in 1986 and 1994). In 2018 the school moved from the 6A-2 Metro League to the 6A-3 Pacific Conference. In the 2007–08 season Glencoe won its first state championship in soccer. Its cross-town rival has been Hillsboro High School; however, Hilhi currently plays in the 5A-1 Northwest Oregon Conference. Since opening, the school has used the off-campus Hare Field for football games.

The school has been state champions in the following sports in the following years:
 2010 - 5A softball
 2007 - 5A boys' soccer
 1994 - 4A football
 1990 - 4A girls' basketball
 1989 - 3A boys' track and field
 1986 - 3A football
 1983 - 3A boys' basketball

The school offers a variety of sports, including:
 Baseball
 Basketball
 Boxing
 Cheer
 Cross Country
 Dance team
 Equestrian team
 Football
 Golf
 Skiing
 Soccer
 Softball
 Swimming
 Tennis
 Track and field
 Tug-O-War
 Volleyball
 Wrestling

Extracurricular offerings
Glencoe is recognized for its dance team, known as the Tidettes. The team has won eleven state championships since 1987 (1987, 1988, 1989, 1990, 1995, 1998, 1999, 2000, 2002, 2003, 2004) competing in either the Show or Dance/Drill Division at the Oregon Dance and Drill State Championships. The Tidettes also placed 2nd at State in 1991, 1992, 1997, and 2017; 3rd in 2001; 4th in 1993, 1996, 2006, and 2008; and 5th in 1994, 2005, 2007, and 2013.

It also has many clubs and activities, including:

 Bowling
 Boys Lacrosse 
 Buddy Club
 Chemistry Club
 Chicas
 Cosmetology Club
 Environmental Impact Club
 Equestrian
 Fellowship of Christian Athletes
 Fellowship of Christian Students
 German Club
 Girls Lacrosse
 Glencoe Democrats
 Glencoe Republicans
 Glencoe Rocket Club
 GSA
 HOSA
 Interact
 Key Club
 K-Pop Club
 Latino Leadership Club
 National English Honor Society
 National Honor Society
 Psychology Club
 Racial Equality Club
 Science Bowl
 Shockwave Robotics
 Ski Team
 Sparrow
 Speech and Debate
 Strength Training Club
 Theatre Club
 Tabletop and Video Gaming Club

Notable alumni
 Erik Ainge, football player
 Jason Earles, actor
 Johnathan Maratoshi, Boxing Referee, Avant garde Jazz Harmonica player.
 Nicholas Edwards, singer
 Lisa Gardner, novelist
 Ben Petrick, baseball player, Colorado Rockies
 Scott Rueck, OSU women's basketball coach

References

External links 
 Official website
 Metro League website

Educational institutions established in 1980
High schools in Washington County, Oregon
Schools in Hillsboro, Oregon
Public high schools in Oregon
1980 establishments in Oregon
Hillsboro School District